The steamship Stettin was a German cargo vessel launched in 1886 built by AG Vulcan Stettin and operated by Norddeutscher Lloyd.

In March 1899, Stettin assisted the German unprotected cruiser , which had run aground off New Pomerania.

Stettin was later renamed Loong Yue and then finally was acquired by Showa Kosen Gyogyo KK and rename Ryuyu Maru before  ultimately being broken up for scrap in 1931.

Notes

References
 

1886 ships
Steamships of Germany
Ships of Norddeutscher Lloyd